Georges Albert Julien Catroux (29 January 1877 – 21 December 1969) was a French Army general and diplomat who served in both World War I and World War II, and served as Grand Chancellor of the Légion d'honneur from 1954 to 1969.

Life

Catroux was born in Limoges, Haute-Vienne. He was the son of a career officer who had risen through the ranks. He was educated at the Prytanée National Militaire, and entered the École spéciale militaire de Saint-Cyr in 1896.

In the early years of his distinguished military career, Catroux moved from Algeria (where he met Charles de Foucauld and then Lyautey) to Indochina. In 1915, while commanding a battalion, he was taken prisoner by the Germans. During his time in captivity, Catroux met Charles de Gaulle, who was then a captain.

After World War I, he became a member of the French military mission to Arabia, and then served in Morocco, Algeria and the Levant.

In July 1939, Catroux was appointed Governor General of French Indochina, and in August 1939, one month before the declaration of war, took over from a senior civil servant, Jules Brévié. Paris wanted to send a strong signal to the Far East on the eve of hostilities. However, after the first Japanese ultimatum of 17 June 1940, and following disagreements with the new Vichy government, Catroux was ordered to hand over his post to Admiral Jean Decoux on 25 June. He initially ignored the order, and only resigned on 20 July.

He then chose to join de Gaulle, who was by now leader of the Free France movement.
As a five-star general, Catroux was the most senior officer of the French Army to transfer allegiance.

 De Gaulle appointed him General Delegate of Free France in the Levant on 24 June 1941. He took control of Syria for the Free French after the defeat of Vichy General Henri Dentz and the Armistice of Saint Jean d'Acre. Shortly after taking up the post, Catroux, in the name of the Free French movement, recognised the independence of Syria. De Gaulle subsequently appointed him Governor General of Algeria in 1943-44.

Officially honored as a French liberation fighter, Catroux was Minister for North Africa in the first government of Charles de Gaulle from 9 September 1944 to 21 October 1945, and became ambassador to the USSR in 1945-48.

After the unrest in Morocco, Catroux negotiated the return of the sultan Mohammed V in 1955.

As Resident Minister in Algeria for the government of Guy Mollet in 1956, he was unable to take up his post because of demonstrations in Algiers by French residents on 6 February.

Catroux presided over a board of inquiry, the Catroux Commission, that investigated the French defeat at the Battle of Dien Bien Phu. He was also the judge in the military tribunal which tried the generals involved in the Algiers putsch of 1961.

He died in Paris in 1969.

References

External links 
  Georges Catroux , biography on the website of the Ordre de la Libération
 

1877 births
1969 deaths
People from Limoges
École Spéciale Militaire de Saint-Cyr alumni
French generals
French military personnel of World War I
French prisoners of war in World War I
World War I prisoners of war held by Germany
French military personnel of World War II
Governors-General of French Indochina
High Commissioners of the Levant
Ambassadors of France to the Soviet Union
20th-century French diplomats
Grand Chanceliers of the Légion d'honneur
Recipients of the Aeronautical Medal
Grand Crosses 1st class of the Order of Merit of the Federal Republic of Germany
Governors general of Algeria